Angela Marie Scanlon (born 29 December 1983) is an Irish television presenter and broadcaster for RTÉ and the BBC. She initially broadcast on Irish television, presenting a number of programmes on RTÉ including the documentary Oi Ginger! in 2014.

Since 2016, she has appeared as a reporter on The One Show, and presented in the absence of Alex Jones. She undertook her first role on a major British show as a co-host of Robot Wars with Dara Ó Briain in 2016.

Early life
Angela Scanlon was born in Ratoath, County Meath, Ireland. Her father worked in construction and her mother worked in administration. She has three sisters. She attended school in Dunshaughlin, Meath. Scanlon then went on to study business at Technological University Dublin (TU Dublin). After graduating, she travelled for a period of time, including six months in New York (where she worked in an Irish pub), in Australia, and South East Asia. Scanlon planned to set up a fashion shop upon returning to Ireland.

Career 
Scanlon has worked as a stylist and a journalist, before moving into television. She wrote for Tatler, Grazia, Company, U Magazine, and Sunday Times Style magazine. She also writes the column "Out of the Closet" for the Irish Independents Weekend magazine. She has been featured in magazines including Vogue, Elle Japan, Sunday Times Style, Company and TWIN.

In 2001, Scanlon was a dancer with the O'Shea Irish Dance Company and appeared in the Irish Thunder show at Busch Gardens Williamsburg in Virginia, USA.

In 2012, The Irish Times described Scanlon as one of "10 Irish Instagrammers You Need to Follow". Scanlon was named as the "one to watch" by Vogue in 2013, and was cited in The Observers regular Why We're Watching feature as the UK's new onscreen fashion queen. The Daily Telegraph also commended Scanlon's talents in Who's That Girl. In 2013, she fronted a campaign for Louis Vuitton.

After working on fashion shows Xposé and Off the Rails for RTÉ and on Channel 4's Sunday Brunch, Scanlon went on to join RTÉ's The Movie Show as a reporter, and on The Love Clinic in 2012. In 2013 and 2014, she appeared on the popular The Saturday Night Show with host Brendan O'Connor.

Scanlon joined the panel of Next Week's News in February 2014 and also put together a Yahoo! 12-part series Work the Look demonstrating how to pull off key essential looks.

Her first major documentary Oi Ginger! was broadcast in 2014. Angela Scanlon: Full Frontal was her follow-up series airing in October 2014, addressing subjects sometimes considered taboo. Scanlon was featured on Republic of Telly's Ginger is the New Black in October 2014.

In 2014, she hosted London Fashion Weekend for a third time, a job she took over from Caroline Flack after hosting the Vodafone Live Lounge for the British Fashion Council at the event for two years. Scanlon co-hosts BBC Northern Ireland/RTÉ's popular holiday programme, Getaways, having taken over from Aoibhinn Ní Shúilleabháin. Scanlon also launched Marks & Spencer's pop-up Halloween shop with Joanna Lumley in aid of Oxfam.

In November 2016, it was announced that Scanlon, along with Michelle Ackerley, would provide maternity cover for Alex Jones and co-present The One Show with Matt Baker in early 2017.

In 2016, she presented her own series, Angela Scanlon's Close Encounters!, and the documentary, Trump's Unlikely Superfans, for BBC Three.

In 2017, Scanlon was revealed as a Garnier ambassador, alongside Holly Willoughby and Davina McCall. She did not appear as part of the advertising campaign in 2018, leaving Willoughby and McCall to continue to work with the brand.

From 2018 to 2021, Scanlon hosted her own BBC Radio 2 show on Sunday mornings from 4 to 6am. Her final show aired on 25 April 2021. She covered for Sara Cox while Sara was covering for Chris Evans on The Radio 2 Breakfast Show on 11 and 15 to 18 October 2018.

On 16 April 2019, Scanlon started presenting a new 15-part TV series for BBC Two called Your Home Made Perfect, a home renovation series that pits the architects Laura-Jane Clark and Robert Jamison against each other to see who can come up with the best design for a problem home. Ground-breaking virtual reality technology and VFX are employed to showcase the two potential renovation solutions, with the couple finally choosing which design to proceed with. A second series was commissioned and broadcast from 9 October 2019.

In January 2022, Scanlon appeared on BBC1's The Wheel (game show) as a guest expert on redheads.

Personal life
She has been married to Roy Horgan since 2014; they have two daughters. They reside in North London.

FilmographyTelevision'

References

External links
 BBC One Show profile
 

1983 births
Living people
Irish television presenters
Irish women television presenters
Fashion journalists
Irish columnists
Irish women journalists
Irish women columnists
People from County Meath
BBC television presenters
RTÉ television presenters
Television presenters from the Republic of Ireland
Alumni of Dublin Institute of Technology
Robot Wars (TV series) presenters
BBC Radio 2 presenters